The Abagas (Khalkha-Mongolian:Авга/Avga) are a Southern Mongolian ethnic groups in Abag Banner, Inner Mongolia, China.

See also 

 Demographics of China
 List of modern Mongolian clans

Southern Mongols
Mongols